Vashakidze is a Georgian surname. Notable people with the surname include:

Irakli Vashakidze (born 1976), Georgian footballer
Mikheil Vashakidze (1909–1956), Georgian astronomer
Tamaz Vashakidze (born 1961), Georgian ballet dancer and teacher

See also
Vashakidze (crater), lunar impact crater

Surnames of Georgian origin
Georgian-language surnames